The 2013 PEI Tankard, the Prince Edward Island men's curling championship, was held from February 6 to 12 at the Crapaud Community Curling Club in Crapaud, Prince Edward Island. The winner of the Tankard, Team Eddie MacKenzie represented Prince Edward Island at the 2013 Tim Hortons Brier in Edmonton, Alberta.

Postponements
Due to the February 2013 nor'easter that hit the island, games scheduled for February 9 and 10 were postponed until the 11th and 12th. The event was originally scheduled to end on February 10.

Teams
The teams are listed as follows:

Results

A Event

B Event

C Event

Playoffs

1 vs. 2  
February 11, 16:00

3 vs. 4  
February 11, 16:00

Semifinal  
February 12, 11:00

Final  
February 12, 16:00

References

External links

PEI Tankard